After Class is a Hong Kong Cantopop girl group formed from Hong Kong broadcaster TVB's reality talent show  in 2021. The group consists of four members: Gigi Yim, Windy Zhan, Chantel Yiu and Yumi Chung. They debuted on 27 November 2021, with the first single "Present For Future" (要為今日回憶).

History

2021-22: Formation
In the competition, which is also the first season of its competition series, Gigi Yim, Windy Zhan, Chantel Yiu, and Yumi Chung are the youngest contestants among all.

The Quartet have been called the "Four Little Flowers of Stars Academy" (聲夢四小花) since the end of the competition. On 25 November 2021, all four members hinted that they would form a group called "After Class" through their Instagram accounts. Two days later, the music video of the group's debut "Present For Future" was released via YouTube. On 28 November, After Class made their live debut performance of "Present For Future" in the annual charity fundraising show , co-organised by the Po Leung Kuk and TVB, at the Hong Kong Coliseum. Later, the TVB drama , which stars all four members, aired on the TVB Jade starting from 5 December 2021 till 13 February 2022, and their performances have attracted media attention.

On 23 January 2022, the group gained their first peak chart position in TVB with their debut "Present For Future". The group hosted their first virtual concert in "Yahoo Metaverse" organised by Yahoo Hong Kong on 17 June 2022.

On 16 November 2022, All About Music released a teaser of After Class's dance-pop single "Not Givin' Up", and the song was sent to local radio stations the next day. On 18 November, the lyrics video of "Not Givin' Up" was released via YouTube. On 4 December, After Class's live performance of the song at the TVB City was premiered in the annual charity fundraising show Tung Wah Charity Show, co-organised by the Tung Wah Group of Hospitals and TVB.

Name
According to member Chantel Yiu, their manager named the group "After Class" as the members could only work and meet after class.

Members

Discography

Singles

Awards and nominations

References

Hong Kong girl groups
Cantopop musical groups
Musical groups established in 2021
2021 establishments in Hong Kong
Musical quartets
Hong Kong idols